Northwest University is a public university located in Xi'an, China. Co-funded by the Ministry of Education of China and Shaaxi Provincial Government, it is one of the nation's leading comprehensive universities. It was founded in 1902 as one of the oldest educational institutions in Northwest China. It is a Chinese state Double First Class University Plan university identified by the Ministry of Education of China.

Presently, Northwest University has 11 colleges, 33 departments, 63 Bachelor's and Associate's programs, with a total enrollment of 18,000 students, including roughly 2,000 graduate students and 1,000 international students.

History
Northwest University has its origin in Shaanxi College founded in 1902, and assumed its present name in 1912. It was renamed National Northwest University in 1923, and called National Xi'an Provisional University after the merger with National Beiping University, Beiping Normal University, Beiyang College of Engineering and other institutions, which moved inland to Shaanxi when the War of Resistance Against Japanese Aggression broke out in 1937. The Provisional University was subsequently named National Northwest Associated University in 1938, and National Northwest University in 1939.

In the early period after the founding of the People's Republic of China, Northwest University was one of the 14 comprehensive universities under the direct administration of the central government's Ministry of Education. In 1958, the university came under the administration of the Shaanxi Provincial Government. In 1978, it was designated as one of the key universities in China. Currently, the university is one of China's leading comprehensive, multi-disciplinary universities of liberal arts, sciences, engineering, management, law and medicine, with equal emphasis on both teaching and research. It is also one of the institutions of higher learning listed in the State's Project 211, and one of the universities supported by the State in its western China development campaign.

Academics
It is one of the first institutions empowered to set up doctoral, postdoctoral and master's programs, to approve the promotion to professorship, and to select Ph.D. supervisors. To date the university has established 37 doctoral programs (of which 6 belong to the first-category disciplines), 92 Master's programs (including special programs like MBA, MPA and Master of Engineering) and 9 postdoctoral programs. The university also boasts 6 national bases for talent training, one national education base for cultural education of college students, 3 national key disciplines, 39 provincial key disciplines, one national engineering and technology center, 11 ministerial or provincial key labs and engineering and technology research centers.

Rankings 

In 2017, Times Higher Education ranked the university within the 801-1000 band globally.

Staff and students
The university has a faculty and staff of over 2,300, of which 1,100 are full-time faculty, and nearly 600 are professors and associate professors. The faculty is also distinguished by 2 academicians and 7 part-time academicians of the Chinese Academy of Sciences, and 4 honored professors under the auspices of the "Cheung Kong Scholars Program". The university's student population amounts to about 18,000 including 2,000 doctoral and graduate students, and 150 international students. Since the founding of the People's Republic of China, the university has educated more than 100,000 graduates of different disciplines for the nation. The university was  praised as "the Mother of Chinese Petroleum Engineering Talents" and "the Cradle of Economists".

References

External links
 Northwest University website

 
Universities and colleges in Xi'an
Project 211
1902 establishments in China
Educational institutions established in 1902